Park Na-ri (born March 3, 1988) is a South Korean swimmer, who specialized in freestyle and individual medley events. She won two bronze medals, as a member of the South Korean swimming team, in the 800 m freestyle relay at the 2006 Asian Games in Doha, Qatar, and at the 2010 Asian Games in Guangzhou, China.

Park qualified for the women's 200 m individual medley at the 2004 Summer Olympics in Athens, by attaining a B-standard entry time of 2:20.17. Park challenged five other swimmers on the first heat, including two-time Olympians Marina Mulyayeva of Kazakhstan and Vered Borochovski of Israel. She edged out Iceland's Lára Hrund Bjargardóttir to a third-place sprint by more than six tenths of a second (0.60) with a time of 2:21.48. Park failed to qualify for the semifinals, as she placed twenty-sixth overall in the preliminaries.

References

1988 births
Living people
South Korean female medley swimmers
Olympic swimmers of South Korea
Swimmers at the 2004 Summer Olympics
Asian Games medalists in swimming
Swimmers at the 2006 Asian Games
Swimmers at the 2010 Asian Games
South Korean female freestyle swimmers

Asian Games bronze medalists for South Korea
Medalists at the 2006 Asian Games
Medalists at the 2010 Asian Games
20th-century South Korean women
21st-century South Korean women